The Carlsbad Current-Argus is a newspaper in Carlsbad, New Mexico, United States. It has been published since 1889. The newspaper, printed in a broadsheet format, is published daily except Mondays.

History
The Current-Argus is the result of a merger of the now-defunct Carlsbad Current and Carlsbad Argus. It was described in 1953 as conservative. The paper was owned by MediaNews and part of the Digital First Media company. The Current-Argus was a part of the Texas-New Mexico Newspapers Partnership, a 2003 joint venture between Gannett and MediaNews Group. In 2015, Gannett acquired full ownership of the Texas-New Mexico Newspapers Partnership.

Features

Sections
The newspaper publishes two sections:

 A: local news, the Little-Argus (listing of community events), regional and state news, opinions and letters to the editor, wire service articles, and weather.
 B: local sports, national sports, classified ads, legal notices, comics, and puzzles.

Additionally, special sections appear throughout the week:

 Sunday: "Sunday Living" features stories spotlighting a resident's hobby, history, or the like.
 Saturday: "Vamonos" is a regional entertainment section that is also inserted into the Ruidoso News and Alamogordo Daily News.

Web site
A subscription-based web site contains all the main articles that are published in the print edition. When local breaking news occurs, a brief story about the event is usually posted. Historical and additional photos from stories are present in an online gallery. Local blogs written by residents have also been hosted, with topics ranging from caving to politics to books. The Current-Argus also produces online web video features highlighting special events and sports around town.

References

External links
 Official website

1889 establishments in New Mexico Territory
Carlsbad, New Mexico
Gannett publications
Newspapers established in 1889
Newspapers published in New Mexico